is a railway station in Shimogyo-ku, Kyoto, Japan.

Lines
 West Japan Railway Company (JR West)
 Sagano Line (Sanin Main Line)

Layout

The elevated station has an island platform with two tracks.

History
On 16 March 1976, the station was moved  northward and elevated. At this time, the freight facilities of the station, which had served Kyoto Central Wholesale Market, were not elevated and became independent . The freight terminal closed on 1 February 1984.

Station numbering was introduced in March 2018 with Tamabaguchi being assigned station number JR-E03.

Nearby
The station directly abuts the Kyoto Central Wholesale Market, and nearby is the defunct courtesan's district of Shimabara.

References

Railway stations in Kyoto Prefecture
Railway stations in Japan opened in 1897
Railway stations in Kyoto
Sanin Main Line